Kyösti Haataja (19 February 1881 – 10 August 1956) was a twentieth century Finnish politician, born in Oulu. He was a member of the Parliament of Finland from 1916 to 1919 and again from 1929 to 1930.

He was a member of the National Coalition Party and was the chairman of the party between 1926 and 1932 following Hugo Suolahti. He died in Helsinki, aged 75.

References 

1881 births
1956 deaths
People from Oulu
People from Oulu Province (Grand Duchy of Finland)
Finnish Party politicians
National Coalition Party politicians
Members of the Parliament of Finland (1916–17)
Members of the Parliament of Finland (1917–19)
Members of the Parliament of Finland (1929–30)
People of the Finnish Civil War (White side) 
University of Helsinki alumni
Academic staff of the University of Helsinki